Papyrus 86 (in the Gregory-Aland numbering), designated by siglum 𝔓86, is an early copy of the New Testament in Greek. It is a papyrus manuscript of the Gospel of Matthew. The manuscript palaeographically has been assigned to the 4th century.

The surviving texts of Matthew are verses 5:13-16, 22-25.

 Text
The Greek text of this codex is a representative of the Alexandrian text-type. Aland placed it in Category II, it means, it has some alien readings.

 Location
It is currently housed at the Institut für Altertumskunde in University of Cologne (P. Col. theol. 5516) in Cologne.

See also 

 List of New Testament papyri

References

Further reading 

 C. Charalambakis, D. Hagedorn, D. Kaimakis, and L. Thüngen, Vier literarische Papyri der Kölner Sammlung, no. 4, Zeitschrift für Papyrologie und Epigraphik 14 (Barcelona: 1974), pp. 37–40. 
 B. Kramer and D. Hagedorn, Papyrologica Coloniensia VII, 2 (Cologne, 1978), pp. 88–89.

Images 
 Leaf from 𝔓86 recto
 Leaf from 𝔓86 verso

New Testament papyri
4th-century biblical manuscripts
Gospel of Matthew papyri